Apas are oblong-shaped biscuits that are topped with sugar. Apas biscuits are a part of Filipino cuisine.

Apa is also the Tagalog term for wafer, especially ice cream cones.

See also
Lengua de gato
Utap
Broas
 Ladyfinger (biscuit)
 List of Philippine desserts

References

External links
 

Philippine desserts
Biscuits
Philippine breads